Katten may refer to:

 Pantteri, a Finnish candy sold in Sweden under the name "Katten"
 Katten Beach, a beach in Oslo, Norway 
 Katten Muchin Rosenman, a law firm
 The Danish ship Katten, a vessel of the Dano-Norwegian Navy which participated in Christian IV's expeditions to Greenland